Maple Ridge is an unincorporated community in Arenac County within Clayton Township and Mason Township at , about twelve miles north of Standish. A post office operated here from December 4, 1873 until June 14, 1919.  As an unincorporated community, Maple Ridge has no defined area or population statistics.

References 

Unincorporated communities in Arenac County, Michigan
Unincorporated communities in Michigan